Ahmad Balshe (born 7 April 1984), known professionally as Belly, is a Palestinian-Canadian rapper, singer, songwriter, and record producer. Born in Jenin, Balshe was raised in Ottawa.  At twenty-one years old, he moved on to his main love hip-hop with the release of his debut mixtape, Death Before Dishonor: Vol. 1. He then released eight additional projects in a span of six years, including his debut studio album The Revolution (2007), as well as two collaborative mixtapes, The Lost Tapes and The Greatest Dream I Never Had, with Kurupt and DJ Drama, respectively.

After a hiatus from music, Belly secured a recording contract with XO in 2015, and later an additional contract with Roc Nation, after co-writing a variety of songs for R&B artists the Weeknd and Beyoncé. Belly received a total of eleven credits across the former's latest studio albums, while also providing backing vocals and co-writing the song "6 Inch" from the latter's album, Lemonade. Belly then went on to release four mixtapes, and his second studio album Immigrant in 2018.

Belly was honoured as Songwriter of the Year at the 2016 SOCAN (Society of Composers, Authors and Music Publishers of Canada) Awards for his "significant and outstanding contributions to popular music over the past year". Alongside his SOCAN award, Belly has won a Juno Award, three MuchMusic Video Awards, and has twice attained a top chart position in the national Much Music Countdown. In 2020, he co-wrote tracks on the Weeknd's fourth studio album After Hours,  including the 2019 single "Blinding Lights", which eventually became the Billlboard #1 Greatest Hot 100 Hit of All Time in 2021.

Early life 
Ahmad Balshe was born on 7 April 1984 in Jenin, Palestine. When he was seven years old, he moved to Ottawa, Ontario, Canada with his family, through Saudi Arabia, Lebanon, and Jordan, to escape violence and poverty.

Career

2007–2008: Early career and The Revolution

Belly's first single, "Pressure" featuring Ginuwine, peaked at number 10 on the Canadian CHR radio charts, and number one on MuchMusic's Video chart. In April 2007, he released the video for his second single "Don't Be Shy", featuring Nina Sky, as well as the video for "History of Violence" directed by Martin Verigin and Jeffrey Hagerman. The latter remains his most controversial record to date, as he explains his views on the Israeli–Palestinian conflict and the War in Iraq.

During the 2007 NHL Playoffs, as the Ottawa Senators were competing, Belly released the single "Bandwagon", produced by Hussain Hamdan. When the Senators made the Stanley Cup Finals, he released a second version of the song which featured goaltender Ray Emery.

His debut album, The Revolution, was released on 5 June 2007. This double disc album was divided into two sections: The People and The System. The People contained more in depth songs, such as "History of Violence", "Follow Me", and "Revolutionary", where he challenges his listeners to discover the facts regarding the Middle East situation. Other songs on this disc include "People Change" and "Leave Me Alone", where he talks about his longtime friends and the memories that he kept from them. The System contained his hit singles "Ridin'", and "Pleasure".

The Revolution achieved Gold sales in Canada and won the 2008 Juno Award for Rap Recording of the Year. The singles from The Revolution won two MuchMusic Video Awards for Best Rap Video: "Pressure" in 2007 and "Ridin'" in 2008.

2011–2012: Additional mixtapes and hiatus
In 2011, Belly released his fifth mixtape Sleepless Nights, hosted by DJ ill Will. He also released his sixth mixtape in collaboration with rapper Kurupt entitled Belly & Kurupt The Lost Tapes 2008. The mixtape, also hosted by DJ ill Will, contained a compilation of songs the two had worked on some time after Belly's debut studio album was released. Some of the songs featured on the mixtape were previously unreleased. Belly then released his seventh mixtape The Greatest Dream I Never Had, hosted by DJ Drama.

Belly's next project Sleepless Nights 1.5 was released in April 2012. The first single, "Hot Girl" featuring Snoop Dogg, was released on 8 September 2009. Its second single, "To The Top" featuring Ava, was released in 2010. Belly's first single of 2011 was "Back Against the Wall", featuring singer Kobe Honeycutt.

2015–2016: Signing to XO and Roc Nation

In May 2015, after a five-year hiatus, Belly released his eighth mixtape Up for Days. It was his first project to be released under the record labels XO and Roc Nation and featured guest appearances by Travis Scott, Juelz Santana, French Montana and the Weeknd. Belly was also prominently featured on the Weeknd's sophomore album Beauty Behind the Madness in August 2015, earning writing credits on six of the fourteen songs: "Often", "The Hills", "Shameless", "Earned It", "In the Night" and "As You Are". On 24 November 2015, Belly formally signed to Roc Nation.

In February 2016, Belly released the single "Zanzibar", featuring Juicy J. On 27 May, he released his ninth mixtape Another Day in Paradise, which featured guest appearances by Travis Scott, Lil Wayne, Kehlani, Starrah, Waka Flocka, Juicy J and B-Real Asal Hazel. On 11 November, he released his tenth mixtape Inzombia. It featured guest appearances from Young Thug, Zack, Nav, Future, Ty Dolla $ign, Jadakiss and Ashanti. The mixtape was supported by two singles; "Consuela" and "The Day I Met You". Later that month, the Weeknd released his third studio album Starboy, with Belly earning writing credits on nine of the eighteen songs: "Party Monster", "False Alarm", "Rockin'", "Six Feet Under", "Love to Lay", "A Lonely Night", "Ordinary Life", "Nothing Without You" and "All I Know".

2017–2018: Mumble Rap and Immigrant

On 23 June 2017, Belly was featured on DJ Khaled's tenth studio album Grateful on the song "Interlude". On 6 October, he released his eleventh mixtape Mumble Rap, which was executive produced by Boi-1da. On 8 December, he was featured on Juicy J's fourth studio album Rubba Band Business on the song "On & On", which also featured Tory Lanez.

On 23 March 2018, Belly released the single "4 Days", featuring rapper YG and producer DJ Mustard. The song's music video was released three days later. He then released the single "Maintain" featuring Nav on 6 April, followed by the single "What You Want" featuring the Weeknd, which was released on 24 May. Both singles appeared on his second studio album, Immigrant, which was released on 12 October. The album also features guest appearances from Zack, French Montana, Meek Mill, Yo Gotti, and M.I.A.

2021: See You Next Wednesday

On 7 April 2021, Belly released the first single from his third studio album See You Next Wednesday, "Money on the Table" featuring Benny the Butcher. He then released the second single, "Zero Love" featuring Moneybagg Yo, on 3 June. On 22 July, he released the third single "Better Believe" featuring the Weeknd and Young Thug. The song debuted on the US Billboard Hot 100 chart at number 88. On 18 August, Belly revealed the album artwork and tracklist, and announced the release date of 27 August. The album also features guest appearances by Nas, Nav, Gunna, Big Sean, Lil Uzi Vert, and PnB Rock.

On December 17, 2021, a new posthumous single from Aaliyah was released, titled "Poison". The song featured The Weeknd, who was credited as a co-writer alongside Static Major and Belly. "Poison" contains vocals recorded by Aaliyah shortly before her death in 2001. Garrett can be heard delivering background vocals.

Personal life 

On 30 July 2019, Balshe filed a lawsuit against Coachella Music LLC, Goldenvoice LLC, and IPS Security Incorporated alleging assault and battery, negligence, and emotional distress in response to an incident which occurred during the 2018 Coachella Music Festival. A video obtained by TMZ shows festival security staff pushing Balshe up against a security barrier and repeatedly punching him.

On 31 May 2021, Balshe announced his engagement to resident doctor Dina Rabadi.

Discography

Studio albums
 The Revolution (2007)
 Immigrant (2018)
 See You Next Wednesday (2021)

Awards and nominations

Academy Awards

Black Reel Awards

Grammy Awards

iHeartRadio Music Awards

Juno Award

SOCAN Songwriting Prize

References

External links 
 

1984 births
Living people
21st-century Canadian male musicians
21st-century Canadian rappers
Alternative R&B musicians
Canadian hip hop singers
Canadian hip hop record producers
Canadian male rappers
Canadian male singer-songwriters
Canadian Muslims
Canadian people of Jordanian descent
Canadian people of Palestinian descent
Jordanian emigrants to Canada
Jordanian Muslims
Juno Award for Rap Recording of the Year winners
Juno Award for Songwriter of the Year winners
Musicians from Ottawa
Palestinian emigrants to Canada
Palestinian Muslims
Palestinian rappers
People from Jenin
Republic Records artists
Roc Nation artists
Trap musicians
XO (record label)